Euphranta canadensis, the currant fruit fly, is a species of fruit fly in the family Tephritidae.

References

 Bosik, Joseph J., Chairman, et al. (Committee on Common Names of Insects) (1997). Common Names of Insects and Related Organisms, 238.
 Norrbom, A. L., L. E. Carroll, F. C. Thompson, I. M. White and A. Freidberg / F. C. Thompson, ed. (1998). "Systematic database of names". Fruit Fly Expert Identification System and Systematic Information Database. Myia, vol. 9, 65-251.
 Richard H. Foote, P. L. Blanc, Allen L. Norrbom. (1993). Handbook of the Fruit Flies (Diptera: Tephritidae) of America North of Mexico. Cornell University Press (Comstock Publishing).

Further reading

External links

 Diptera.info

Trypetinae